Matsumoto Dam  is a gravity dam located in Kagoshima Prefecture in Japan. The dam is used for irrigation. The catchment area of the dam is 2.9 km2. The dam impounds about 6  ha of land when full and can store 640 thousand cubic meters of water. The construction of the dam was started on 1986 and completed in 2002.

See also
List of dams in Japan

References

Dams in Kagoshima Prefecture